Piotrowicz (neuter), Piotrowiczowa (archaic feminine) is a Polish-language surname derived form the given name Piotr (Peter). Notable people with this surname include:
Robert Piotrowicz
Marek Piotrowicz
Maria Piotrowiczowa

Polish-language surnames
Surnames from given names